Utica-Rome Speedway is a -mile dirt oval raceway in Vernon, New York. It is known as the “Home of Heroes” and has been the home track of several NASCAR national champions.

History
The Utica-Rome Speedway was built in 1961 by Joe Lesik as a flat quarter-mile asphalt track.   The asphalt was torn up in 1979 when the track was enlarged to five-eighths of a mile before settling at its current length in the late 1980s.

National Champions
The inaugural 1961 as well as the 1962 track championships were claimed by Rene Charland, who went on to become the only driver to win four consecutive NASCAR Sportsman Division championships (predecessor of the Xfinity Series).  Two time national Sportsman Division champion Billy Wimble claimed track championships in 1966 and 1967.

NASCAR Hall of Fame inductee and 6 time  NASCAR national modified champion Jerry Cook was the 1969 track champion, while fellow inductee and 9 time national champion Richie Evans won the track championships in 1972, 1973, 1974, and 1978. 

Geoff Bodine, the 1986 Daytona 500 winner, was a 1977 track champion. Perennial NASCAR Truck Series contender Stewart Friesen won the track championships in 2004, 2007 and then 5 consecutive times from 2010 to 2014.

References

Dirt oval race tracks in the United States
Sports venues in Oneida County, New York
Motorsport venues in New York (state)
1961 establishments in New York (state)
Sports venues completed in 1961